By definition an audit is, 
 An examination of records or financial accounts to check their accuracy.
 An adjustment or correction of accounts.
 An examined and verified account.

A freight audit vendor is therefore one who examines, adjusts and verifies freight bills for accuracy.

Therefore, a freight audit is the process of examining, adjusting and verifying freight bills for accuracy.

Freight costs''

 Costs incurred by the merchant in moving goods, by whatever means, from one place to another under the terms of the contract of carriage. In addition to transport costs this may include such elements as packing, documentation, loading, unloading and transport insurance.

Complexity of Freight Audit

Rising freight cost is an emerging area of concern as seen in recent years. The cost of freight has been rising due to the increase in oil prices and all freight cost is highly dependent on the cost of transportation which relates directly to fuel prices. With high fluctuations of fuel costs, low visibility of the future freight costs and high complexity of the freight quotes, freight cost verification are vulnerable to human and process errors and this requires proper auditing to ensure that the organization does not overpay for services it did not incur.

The forwarder freight rates are usually maintained in multiple spreadsheets and usually each forwarder has a different freight rate format to the customer. An organization is daunted with the task of calculating the freight rates manually and this task can be challenging when the customer has hundreds of shipments shipped each month. Most organizations do not have the manpower to calculate all the freight invoices issued to them and at best, they perform random sampling to check if the sample invoice is billed correctly. Some organizations have the manpower to perform freight audit themselves, the manual and tedious efforts required for a freight audit will usually end up much more expensive than an outsource vendor might be able to provide.

Many Freight Auditors are now offering Parcel Auditing Services which include UPS, Federal Express, DHL, Purolator etc.

Freight Audit Process

Inbound logistics details the freight audit process as follows:

“To begin the auditing process, a freight bill payment company receives its clients' freight bills directly from carriers. When the bills are received, either via electronic data interchange (EDI) or manually, they are entered into the contractor's system, providing immediate visibility. Once the bills are entered, they are audited for accuracy. Auditors verify the bills' validity, mileage, duplicate payments, accessorial charges, and use of correct tariffs. After auditing, the charges are coded and reconciled, and the bills are paid.”

Some companies have adopted a process called self billing''' to pay freight bills. The customers calculate their freight cost themselves and instruct the freight forwarder to invoice using credit notes. This process transfers the responsibility to correct freight calculation from the customer to the forwarder.

Models of freight audit
There are 3 models of freight audit used today. The 3 models are listed as below.

 Manual match—Pay for in-house staff to manually process invoices and conduct audits, with costs, errors and unrecovered charges rising as international transportation volumes grow;
 Buy packaged software—Pay an upfront license to acquire a software package (TMS), and then install, operate and maintain the software, rates, and electronic integrations to carriers, using expensive internal resources; or
 Outsource—Pay fees to a third-party firm, send them freight invoices, and then absorb additional costs and time to administer the service, track discrepancies, and recoup unrecovered charges.  Outsource is typically contingency pricing model

The first option of manual matching is tedious and the cost of auditing a freight invoice rise with the number of freight invoice proportionally.

The 2nd option of buying packaged software allows the company to save time and resources in the invoice processing but the company will need to invest in the training of the staff and system infrastructure to maintain an expert process and system. The freight audit system will be able to eliminate the mundane freight calculation and matching process and the users of the system will be able to perform value add activities such as analyzing freight rates, negotiation with freight forwarders or recovering freight invoice discrepancy with freight forwarders.

For option 3, ideally, the 3rd party firm should use a freight audit system and not handle the freight invoices manually. The freight audit system maintained by a team of expert users will eliminate the cost of training users and infrastructure setup cost. Although the cost of outsource may seem to be higher than buying a packaged software, it includes the maintenance cost of a freight system which may cost more for a team of non experts from the customer to manage.

Freight audit on shipment or freight invoice level
Freight audit can be conducted at the shipment or freight invoice level. A company that has standard weights for standard packages may opt to audit freight invoices at freight invoice level to reduce complexity in the freight audit process. This is known as freight invoice validation and this process is simple as compared to a freight audit at shipment level. 
A company that has a more complex shipping process may choose to go for freight invoice verification. This freight invoice verification process is a flexible solution that allows the customer to use their shipment and package measurements and calculate against the freight quotes and finally compare against the freight invoice. By having detail shipment information, customers can analyze freight cost by product line reports or interface payment information into their ERP systems.

Benefits of freight audit
Inbound logistics noted that for many companies, outsourcing could be the most economical way to properly audit and process freight invoices. They have also noted that the cost to verify, process and finally pay an internal freight invoice is around US$11 and the cost of outsourcing is around 5 to 10% of the internal cost and that has not included the cost savings from the invoice discrepancies. The discrepancies can be as much as 8.8% of the freight invoices.

The provider of a freight audit can also provide automated cost allocation, reduction of invoices and comprehensive reports for the customer to make intelligent business decisions such as consolidation of shipments to a certain forwarder and landed costing of each product group. These reports are critical to a product costing and planning strategy in order to make the product successful in the targeted area.

Freight cost reports can be generated to compare the freight costs for forwarders and the customers may use such reports to flag out service failures, negotiate for better freight deals or the opportunity to consolidate the shipments to a forwarder for a better rate. Customers can simulate the freight cost calculation for new freight rates or packages proposed by the forwarder and determine if this is suitable for their business model.
With large fluctuations in the surcharges, the accounts department will have lower visibility in accruing freight cost. By choosing a freight invoice verification model, a customer can forecast the freight cost to be accrued for accounting purposes. This translates to lesser risk and more predictability in cash flow for the company. Akzo Nobel’s automated freight audit process has also instilled tighter controls over their freight accounting by eliminating human communication and intervention from the point of the freight quote to the payment process. By controlling the human communication and minimizing human intervention, the audit process will be unbiased and less likely to deviate from the proper process.

References
 Dealer Auditing Software

Freight transport